Joey McNicol is an activist against E-mail spam.  He became notable after a high-profile court case in which he was the defendant.  The case alleged that he had caused IP addresses of companies controlled by Wayne Mansfield to be blacklisted. The case against him was dismissed in October 2002.

See also
 Spam Act 2003
 Wayne Mansfield

External links
 Joe Fights Spam (Inactive as of 2010)
 Details of the case against McNicol (Inactive as of 2010) Wayback Machine listing for this page

Living people
Year of birth missing (living people)